Tmesisternus mehli is a species of beetle in the family Cerambycidae. It was described by Weigel in 2008. It is known from Papua New Guinea.

References

mehli
Beetles described in 2008